The Clarence River (Bundjalung: Boorimbah, Yaygir: Ngunitiji) is a river situated in the Northern Rivers district of New South Wales, Australia.

The river rises on the eastern slopes of the Great Dividing Range, in the Border Ranges west of Bonalbo, near Rivertree at the junction of Koreelah Creek and Maryland River, on the watershed that marks the border between New South Wales and Queensland. The river flows generally south, south east and north east, joined by twenty-four tributaries including the Tooloom Creek and the Mann, Nymboida, Cataract, Orara, Coldstream, Timbarra, and Esk rivers. The river reaches its mouth at its confluence with the Coral Sea in the South Pacific Ocean, between Iluka and Yamba; descending  over the course of its  length.

On its journey it passes through the towns of Tabulam and Copmanhurst, the city of Grafton, and the towns of Ulmarra, and Maclean. The river features many large river islands, including Woodford, Chatsworth, Ashby, Warregah and Harwood islands; and Susan Island Nature Reserve. The river supports a large prawn trawling and fishing industry.

The Clarence River system is an extensive east coast drainage with many tributaries of differing size. Apart from the Murray River, it is the largest river in mainland Australia south of the Tropic of Capricorn. Its basin is, together with the very similarly-sized Hawkesbury, Australia's largest Pacific watershed south of Bundaberg. The extremely intense rainfalls that typify the North Coast mean, however, that major floods can temporarily raise the flow of the Clarence to 24 feet, as happened in 1890.

Rainfall and climate 

The climate of most of the basin is subtropical (Köppen Cfa), though the highest areas with cooler weather are of the temperate Cfb type. At higher altitudes, rainfall may reach  on exposed slopes but data are very poor. Most of the high areas actually receive no more rain than Grafton though variability from year to year is less.

Flooding
During Cyclone Oswald, the Clarence was subject to minor flooding, brought about due to the storm's residual effects and associated monsoon trough that passed over parts of Queensland and New South Wales. Two years earlier, the river peaked , forcing the evacuation of 3000 people from their homes. On both occasions, the city's levee was credited with preventing more severe flooding.

The local historical society has published an account of newspaper reports documenting flooding of the river from the late 1800s to 2011.

Catchment land use and industry 
Tourism is also a significant industry in the Clarence Valley generating around A$457million per annum and employing around 2500 people. 
Most of the Clarence basin is heavily forested, with important areas of remnant subtropical and temperate rainforest occurring all along the course. Only in alluvial areas where soils are less leached is there major agricultural development: in these areas the chief industries are cattle rearing and the growing of sugar cane in lower-lying areas.

Of particular interest is the small island town of Harwood, where a Sperry New Holland factory and a quaint Bush Pub overlook the Clarence delta. Harwood is also the location of the local sugar mill, the Harwood Sugar Mill built in 1873 and is the oldest Australian mill still operational. The sugar mill is situated on the river due to its importance in transporting sugar cane from farms in the surrounding area in previous times. Harwood is just after the Harwood Bridge on part of Australia's National Highway from Sydney, Port Macquarie, Coffs Harbour to Brisbane.

The freshwater reaches of the Clarence River support important populations of native freshwater fish including Eastern freshwater cod, an endangered fish species unique to the Clarence River system, and Australian bass.

Etymology 
 

The Indigenous Bundjalung people call the river Boorimbah, while the coastal Yaygir people call it the Ngunitiji. The Aboriginal people from the Tenterfield district used the word neyand, meaning "top" as the name for the headwaters of the river.

The river remained unknown to British authorities until the mid 1830s when escaped convict Richard Craig, who had been living with Aboriginals in the area, reported its existence. It was initially called the Big River, but this caused confusion as the Gwydir River in northern New South Wales was also colloquially known by this name.

In November 1839 the Governor of New South Wales, George Gipps, officially changed the name to the Clarence River in honour of the previous King of the British Empire, William IV, 1st Duke of Clarence and St Andrews.

The local government area of the Clarence Valley Council draws its name from the river and covers the lower half of the river valley.

Crossings 
There are very few fixed crossings of the Clarence River. Going downstream, these include:
 Bridge over Hootens Rd Bonalbo
 Bridge at Tabulam, on the Bruxner Highway
 Ernie Baldwin Bridge, at Yates Crossing (Plain Stations Road, Clarence Way)
 Bridge at Lilydale near Copmanhurst
 Rogan Bridge, a bridge that carries the Rogan Bridge Rd
 Grafton Bridge at Grafton
New Grafton Bridge at Grafton
Ulmarra-Southgate Ferry at Ulmarra
 Harwood Bridge at Harwood
 Bluff Point Ferry at Lawrence

Crossings over the south arm of the Clarence River are:
Wingfield Bridge at Cowper
 McFarlane Bridge at Maclean

Crossings over the north arm of the Clarence River are:
Mororo Bridge at Mororo, New South Wales
Warregah Island Bridge, Chatsworth Island, New South Wales
 Sepentine Channel Bridge at Harwood

See also

 Rivers of New South Wales
 List of rivers of Australia

References

Further reading

External links 

 Northern Rivers Geology Blog - Clarence River
Northern Rivers Catchment Management Authority

 

Rivers of New South Wales
Northern Rivers
Kyogle Council